Jackpot was an Irish general knowledge quiz show produced by Telefís Éireann between 6 January 1962 and 9 June 1965.  Presented firstly by Gay Byrne and later by Terry Wogan, the show remained one of the most popular programmes in the first years of the television station.  Jackpot was similar in format to the ITV quiz show Criss Cross Quiz.

References

1962 Irish television series debuts
1965 Irish television series endings
1960s Irish television series
Irish quiz shows
RTÉ original programming
Television game shows with incorrect disambiguation